Isabella Villarama Granada (March 9, 1976 – November 4, 2017) was a Filipino actress and singer.

Early life and education
Isabel Granada was the daughter of Humberto ortiz Granada, a Filipino chief marine engineer, and Isabel Villarama, a Spanish homemaker. Her father died in 1995.

Granada attended the Philippine Air Transport and Training Services College, where she obtained her bachelor's degree in aeronautical engineering in 2001 and secured her private pilot license. She served as an airwoman second class in the Philippine Air Force for two years.

Career
Granada was a commercial model prior to starting a career in acting.

Acting
Granada's career started after auditioning for That's Entertainment in 1986, where she became a member of the Tuesday group. She was part of the cast of the film, Ligaya ang Itawag Mo sa Akin which starred Rosanna Roces, and was given the FAMAS Award for Best Supporting Actress in 1998 for her role in the film. After joining the cast of Ikaw Na Sana Granada became part of the drama series on ABS-CBN entitled Sa Puso Ko Iingatan Ka co-work with Judy Ann Santos and Piolo Pascual.

Granada took a break from showbiz from 2004 to 2006 after giving birth to her son. She resumed her acting career in 2007 with GMA Network and worked with Sine Novela: Pasan Ko Ang Daigdig and Zaido: Pulis Pangkalawakan.

In 2008, Granada played the role of Elena Valderama in the remake of Kaputol ng Isang Awit with co-star Glaiza de Castro and Lovi Poe, recently shown on the GMA Network. She also appeared in the romantic comedy drama Philippine remake Lalola. In 2009, she was one of the guest stars in the Philippine adaptation of Zorro. During her final years in 2013, she  joined It's Showtime's Bida Kapamilya Celebrity Round with her Kapamilya's and she was working again on ABS-CBN's Got to Believe as Tessa Zaragosa, along with Kathryn Bernardo and Daniel Padilla, among others.

In 2017, she played the challenging role of Jessica in Wish Ko Lang wherein she portrayed a woman disguised as a man just to feed her kids. No one knew that the new carpenter was a woman.

Music
In 1998 Granada released the album Out Here on My Own and in 2000 she released In the Mood for Love.

She recorded a self titled album under Dyna Records with songs like “Crush Na Crush Kita” (You are Really My Crush), Classmate Dear Classmate, and “Di Na Bale” (Never Mind).

Personal life
Granada's first marriage was to Geryk Genasky, a councilor in Pampanga in 2002. They eventually separated after twelve years, but their relationship produced one son, Hubert Thomas Jericho Granada Aguas. She married Arnel Cowley in 2015, and was a stepmother to his daughters: Sarah, a young model and Abbey Cowley.

Around 2006, Granada underwent oophorectomy of her right ovary after a cyst had developed; she again had to undergo the operation in 2008 after two cysts had grown on her left ovary, which were accidentally discovered during a removal of a benign tumor in her uterus.

Coma and death
On October 25, 2017, Granada fell into a coma after experiencing six cardiac arrests during a meet and greet session with her fans in Doha, Qatar. Granada had traveled to Doha with her husband to attend the Philippine Tourism and Trade Conference, where she was a guest speaker. She was rushed to the Heart Hospital of the Hamad Medical Corporation and was later transferred to Hamad General Hospital.

Granada had suffered from a brain hemorrhage and aneurysm that affected her heart. On October 27, 2017, she was declared brain dead. Granada died on November 4, 2017, at age 41. Her body laid in state on November 10–11 at Santuario de San Jose in East Greenhills, Mandaluyong, and was cremated on November 12.

Legacy
Granada was posthumously awarded a star on the Eastwood City Walk of Fame on November 21, 2017.

In December 2017, actress Kim Rodriguez portrayed Granada and actor Benjamin Alves as Granada's husband, Arnel Cowley for their love story on the drama anthology, Wagas.

Filmography

Films

Television

References

External links

1976 births
2017 deaths
20th-century Filipino actresses
21st-century Filipino actresses
Actresses from Manila
Deaths from aneurysm
Deaths in Qatar
Filipino child actresses
20th-century Filipino women singers
Filipino film actresses
Filipino television actresses
Filipino television presenters
Filipino people of Spanish descent
Filipino women comedians
Filipino women television presenters
People from Angeles City
Philippine Air Force personnel
GMA Network personalities
That's Entertainment (Philippine TV series)
That's Entertainment Tuesday Group Members
Participants in Philippine reality television series
Survivor Philippines contestants
ABS-CBN personalities